5D optical data storage (also branded as Superman memory crystal, a reference to the Kryptonian memory crystals from the Superman franchise) is an experimental nanostructured glass for permanently recording digital data using a femtosecond laser writing process. Discs using this technology could be capable of storing up to  worth of data for billions of years. The concept was experimentally demonstrated in 2013. Hitachi and Microsoft have researched glass-based optical storage techniques, the latter under the name Project Silica.

The "5-dimensional" descriptor is for marketing purposes, since the device has 3 physical dimensions and no exotic higher dimensional properties. The fractal/holographic nature of its data storage is also purely 3-dimensional. The size, orientation and three-dimensional position of the nanostructures make up the claimed five dimensions.

Technical design 
The concept is to store data optically in non-photosensitive transparent materials such as fused quartz, which has high chemical stability. Recording data using a femtosecond-laser was first proposed and demonstrated in 1996. The storage medium consists of fused quartz, where the spatial dimensions, intensity, polarization, and wavelength are used to modulate data. By introducing gold or silver nanoparticles embedded in the material, their plasmonic properties can be exploited.

According to the University of Southampton:

Recorded data can be read with a combination of an optical microscope and a polarizer.

The technique was first demonstrated in 2010 by Kazuyuki Hirao's laboratory at the Kyoto University, and developed further by Peter Kazansky's research group at the Optoelectronics Research Centre, University of Southampton.

Uses 

In 2018, Professor Peter Kazansky used the technology to store a copy of Isaac Asimov's Foundation trilogy, which was launched into space aboard Elon Musk's Tesla Roadster in association with the Arch Mission Foundation.

See also 
 3D optical data storage
 DNA digital data storage
 Data store

References

External links 
 Marketing website of the Southampton research team

Big data
Solid-state computer storage media
Non-volatile memory
Digital preservation
Emerging technologies